Agrippina Vasilyevna Shin (born December 29, 1958) is an Uzbek politician who has been Uzbekistan's Minister of Preschool Education since 2017.

Biography
Shin was born on December 29, 1958 in the Samarqand Region to parents of Soviet Korean descent.

She began her career in 1980 as an engineer in the research laboratory of the Tashkent Electrotechnical Institute of Communications. From 1987 to 2017, Shin worked at the Tashkent Vocational College of Information Technologies. Until 2004, she worked at the Secondary Vocational School#4 in Tashkent. There she held positions of master of industrial training and, director and deputy director for educational and industrial work.

In 2015, she was elected to the Senate of Uzbekistan from the city of Tashkent. In the upper house of parliament, she became a member of the committees on international relations, foreign economic relations, foreign investment and tourism. On October 19, 2017, she was appointed as head of the newly created cabinet post of Ministry of Preschool Education. However, she continues to remain a member of the Senate.

Awards
 Order of Friendship: rewarded to group of workers in science, education, health care, culture, art, spirituality and enlightenment, the media and other social spheres, in connection with the seventeenth anniversary of the independence of the Republic of Uzbekistan.
 Order "Mehnat shuhrati": for services in upgrading the activities of the Preschool Education Institutions, sectorial development, introducing modern technologies in education, bring up a healthy and mature generation, as well as on the occasion of her 60th birthday anniversary.
 Order of Diplomatic Service Merit, Gwanghwa Medal (South Korea): for contributions to the expansion and strengthening of friendship between Republic of Korea and Uzbekistan.''

Bibliography

References 

1958 births
Living people
People from Samarqand Region
Education ministers of Uzbekistan
Uzbekistani people of Korean descent
Koryo-saram